Zandraagiin Ganbaatar is a Mongolian Paralympic shooter. He began his career with July’s Worlds where he came seventh-place in Suhl, Germany. On July 7, 2014, he became a gold medal recipient for his participation at P4 Shooting tournament which was hosted at Fort Benning, Georgia.
On October 20, 2014, he received his first bronze medal at the 2014 Asian Para Games in Incheon, South Korea. Currently he is a qualifier for the 2016 Summer Paralympics.

References

External links

Living people
20th-century births
Mongolian male sport shooters
Year of birth missing (living people)